Novus Records (later Arista Novus and RCA Novus) was an American jazz record label run by Steve Backer. Backer worked at Impulse! Records until 1974, when Clive Davis, founder of Arista Records, asked him to oversee the jazz division at Arista.

Backer left Arista in the early 1980s, worked for Windham Hill Records, and then went to RCA to run Novus. Novus's roster included Muhal Richard Abrams, Warren Bernhardt, Steve Coleman, Larry Coryell, Oliver Lake, Steve Lacy, James Moody, Hilton Ruiz, and Henry Threadgill. Beginning in 1989, Backer signed Marcus Roberts, Roy Hargrove, Danilo Pérez, Antonio Hart, and Christopher Hollyday. The label closed in the mid-1990s. The catalogue is now managed by Sony Masterworks through its Masterworks Jazz imprint.

Discography

3000-N (RCA) series
3000: Muhal Richard Abrams – Lifea Blinec
3001: Warren Bernhardt – Solo Piano
3002: Air – Open Air Suit
3003: Oliver Lake – Life Dance of Is
3004: Baird Hersey – Looking for That Groove
3005: Larry Coryell – European Impressions
3006: Ran Blake – Rapport
3007: Muhal Richard Abrams – Spiral Live at Montreux 1978
3008: Air – Montreux Suisse
3009: Mike Mainieri & Warren Bernhardt – Free Smiles
3010: Oliver Lake – Shine
3011: Warren Bernhardt – Floating
3012: Michael Gregory – Gifts
3013: Henry Threadgill – X-75 Volume 1
3014: Air – Air Lore
3015: Michael Gregory – Heart and Center
3016: Baird Hersey – Have You Heard?
3017: Larry Coryell – Tributaries
3018: John Scofield – Who's Who?
3019: Ran Blake – Film Noir
3020: Warren Bernhardt – Manhattan Update
3021: Pharoah Sanders & Norman Connors – Beyond a Dream
3022: John Scofield – Bar Talk
3023: Steve Khan – Evidence
3024: Larry Coryell – Standing Ovation
3025: Henry Threadgill – Easily Slip Into Another World
3032: Michael Shrieve & Steve Roach – The Leaving Time
3054: Chet Baker – Let's Get Lost
3070: Hugh Masekela – Uptownship
3084: Opafire – Opafire featuring Zachary Norman E.
3115: John Hicks, Cecil McBee & Elvin Jones – Power Trio

63000 (BMG) series
63119: Steve Coleman and Five Elements – Black Science
63125: Steve Coleman – Rhythm in Mind
63136: Hugh Masekela – Beatin' Aroun de Bush
63141: John Hicks - Friends Old and New
63144: Steve Coleman and Five Elements – Drop Kick
63153: Mulgrew Miller – Hand in Hand
63160: Steve Coleman and Five Elements – The Tao of Mad Phat
63171: Mulgrew Miller – With Our Own Eyes
63176: Opafire – Without a Trace
63188: Mulgrew Miller – Getting to Know You

References

External links
 Arista/Novus at Discogs.com
 Novus at Discogs.com – Some albums are erroneously filed there, such as AN 3007 - Muhal Richard Abrams - Spiral: Live at Montreux 1978
 Jazz Discography.com
 Article by Robert Christgau

Jazz record labels
Defunct record labels of the United States
 
 
Record labels established in 1978